Bathyala Changal Rayudu S/o Subbaiah Rayudu (born in 1956) is an Andhra Pradesh politician, Telugu Desam Party leader.

Career
 Rayudu represented as Member of Legislative Council in Andhra Pradesh from Indian National Congress Party during 2011-2017. He contested from Rajampet (Assembly constituency) in 2019 from Telugu Desam Party. He is associated with Telugu Desam Party now.

References

1956 births
Living people
People from Kadapa district
Telugu Desam Party politicians
Telugu politicians
People from Rayalaseema